The Old Fort House, also known as Themerlaine, is a historic mansion in Columbus, Mississippi, U.S.. It was built in 1844 for Elias Fort, a planter, and his wife, Martha Williams Battle. It has been listed on the National Register of Historic Places since October 31, 1985.

References

Houses on the National Register of Historic Places in Mississippi
Greek Revival houses in Mississippi
Gothic Revival architecture in Mississippi
Italianate architecture in Mississippi
Houses completed in 1844
National Register of Historic Places in Lowndes County, Mississippi